George Harlow may refer to:

 George Henry Harlow (1787–1819), English portrait painter
 George H. Harlow (1830–1900), American politician